Matzah balls (  pl., singular  ; with numerous other transliterations) or matzo balls are Ashkenazi Jewish soup dumplings made from a mixture of matzah meal, beaten eggs, water, and a fat, such as oil, margarine, or chicken fat. Matzah balls are traditionally served in chicken soup and are a staple food on the Jewish holiday of Passover, though they are not eaten during Passover by those who observe a prohibition on soaking matzah products.

The texture of matzah balls may be light or dense, depending on the recipe. Matzah balls made from some recipes float in soup; others sink.

Transliterations of knaidel
Although there are official transliterations of Yiddish words into English by the YIVO Institute, there are many non-standard transliterations. Alternate transliterations of the Yiddish term for matzah ball, in the singular, include: knaidl, knaidel, kneidl, and kneidel. Transliterations in the plural include: knaidels, knaidlach, knaidelach, kneidels, kneidlach, kneidelach, kneydls, kneydels, and kneydlach.

The various transliterations of the term gave rise to minor controversy in June 2013, when it was the winning word in the Scripps National Spelling Bee. Thirteen-year-old Arvind Mahankali of New York spelled "knaidel" correctly in accordance with Webster's Third New International Dictionary, the official dictionary of the Bee, to become the champion. However, there was controversy whether that was indeed the definitive spelling of the term, with others preferring "knaydel", "kneydel", "knadel", or "kneidel".

See Knödel for further information about the origin of the word and the food itself.

History 

The exact origins of matzo balls – and the traditional matzo ball soup – are unknown. Some historians posit that the copious amounts of matzo meal produced during the Industrial Revolution in the 19th century[Incomplete thought—needs elaboration], others believe that Jews used the crumbs leftover from matzo baking to produce the filling additions to their soup. It is believed that Jews began placing matzo balls in their soup as Eastern European cuisine began introducing dumplings in traditional foods, and Jews were adapting them to their dietary restrictions and culinary tastes. German, Austrian, and Alsatian Jews were the first to prepare matzo balls for their soup; middle eastern Jews introduced additional variations. An early recipe for matzoh ball soup, made with beef stock, is found in The Jewish manual, or, Practical information in Jewish and modern cookery (1846).

Preparation
Schmaltz (chicken fat) imparts a distinctive flavour, but many modern cooks prefer vegetable oils or margarine. The use of butter, while otherwise suitable, violates the Jewish law of kashrut prohibiting consumption of milk and meat products together, if the balls are eaten with chicken soup. The balls are dropped into a pot of salted boiling water or chicken soup, then the heat turned down to a simmer and a lid placed on the pot. The balls swell during the cooking time of 20 to 30 minutes. Adding kosher baking powder for lightness is permissible, even for Passover.

While the recipe is simple, there are also ready matzah ball mixes, typically to be added to beaten egg.

World records
In 2008 Joey Chestnut held the world record for eating matzah balls: 78 of exactly  in 8 minutes, at the Inaugural World Matzoh Ball Eating Championship, a charity event.

In 2010, the world's largest matzah ball was prepared by Chef Jon Wirtis of Shlomo and Vito's New York City Delicatessen, located in Tucson, Arizona. He created a  matzah ball for New York's Jewish Food Festival.

See also

 Jewish cuisine
 Knödel
 Matzo
 Matzah brei

References

External links
Manischewitz Matzo Ball Soup Recipe

Ashkenazi Jewish cuisine
Passover foods
Dumplings
Israeli cuisine
Matzo